Kirtley is a surname.
 Bill Kirtley, English football goalkeeper
 David Barr Kirtley, American writer
 James Kirtley, English cricketer
 John R. Kirtley, American physicist
 Matthew Kirtley, engineer
 Pat Kirtley
 Pete Kirtley
 Thomas Kirtley
 Virginia Kirtley, American actress and writer
 William Kirtley (railway engineer), English railway engineer
 William W. Kirtley, known as Bill, American anti-death penalty activist